Yun Ah-sun (Hangul: 윤아선; born February 18, 2007) is a South Korean figure skater. She is the 2021 South Korean national silver medalist and finished fourth at the 2022 World Junior Championships, winning a small bronze medal for her short program.

Career

Early career
Yun began learning to skate in 2015. She placed eighth at the senior level at the 2020 South Korean Championships and won the silver medal the following year. Due to the COVID-19 pandemic, the 2020–21 international junior season was not held, and Yun was therefore unable to compete on the Junior Grand Prix or at the World Junior Championships.

2021–22 season
With the resumption of international junior competition, Yun was scheduled to make her international debut on the Junior Grand Prix, competing back-to-back weeks in events both held in Courchevel. She placed fifth in both contests. Yun was sixth at the 2022 South Korean Championships.

Due to her national result, Yun was named to South Korea's team for the 2022 World Junior Championships, but events would soon complicate the situation. Shortly after the conclusion of the 2022 Winter Olympics, Russia invaded Ukraine. As a result, the International Skating Union banned all Russian athletes from competing at ISU championships. As Russian women had dominated international figure skating in recent years, this had a significant impact on the field. Due to both the invasion and the Omicron variant, the World Junior Championships could not be held as scheduled in Sofia in early March and were rescheduled for mid-April in Tallinn. Yun placed third in the short program, 0.14 points ahead of American Lindsay Thorngren, winning a bronze small medal. She expressed disappointment at having lost levels on two spins but said she was happy with the performance. She was overtaken by Thorngren in the free skate, finishing in fourth place overall.

2022–23 season
Yun planned to compete at the 2022 CS Nebelhorn Trophy, placing sixth in the short program, but withdrew before the free skate. Making her senior Grand Prix debut at the 2022 Skate America, she came in ninth. Competing at the 2022 CS Ice Challenge, Yun won the short program but ninth in the free skate, dropping to sixth overall.

Programs

Competitive highlights 
GP: Grand Prix; CS: Challenger Series; JGP: Junior Grand Prix

Detailed results

Senior results

Junior results

References

External links 
 

2007 births
South Korean female single skaters
Living people
People from Ansan
Sportspeople from Gyeonggi Province